Detoulgoetia is a genus of tiger moths in the family Erebidae. The genus was erected by Vladimir Viktorovitch Dubatolov in 2006. The moths are found in Madagascar and Comores.
David T. Goodger and Allan Watson (1995) note that the species of this genus have white or yellowish wings speckled with brown dots without order and with dark discal spots.

Species 
 Detoulgoetia aspersa (Mabille, 1879) (now considered as a synonym of D. virginalis)
 Detoulgoetia comorensis Rothschild, 1933
 Detoulgoetia pseudosparsata Rothschild, 1933
 Detoulgoetia virginalis (Butler, 1878)
 Detoulgoetia virginalis comorensis (Rothschild, 1933)
 Detoulgoetia virginalis pseudosparsata (Rothschild, 1933)
 Detoulgoetia virginalis pupieri (Toulgoët, 1991)

References

Natural History Museum Lepidoptera generic names catalog

Spilosomina
Moth genera